Kim Hee-soo (born May 10, 1994), better known as Colde, is a South Korean singer-songwriter. He debuted in 2016 as a member of the indie duo Off On Off. As a solo artist he has released the extended plays Wave (2018), Love Part 1 (2019), and Idealism (2021).

Colde is part of the lineup for the Grand Mint Festival 2020 which is scheduled to take place on October 24-25, 2020 at Olympic Park in Seoul, South Korea.

Discography

Extended plays

Single albums

Singles

As lead artist

Soundtrack appearances

Awards and nominations

References

External links 

 

Living people
South Korean hip hop singers
South Korean contemporary R&B singers
South Korean male singers
South Korean singer-songwriters
1994 births
South Korean male singer-songwriters